E. Joyce Snell (born 1930) is a British statistician who taught in the mathematics department at Imperial College London.
She is known for her work on residuals and ordered categorical data, and for her books on statistics.

Books
Snell is the author or editor of:
Analysis of Binary Data (with David R. Cox, 1969; 2nd ed., Chapman & Hall/CRC, 1989)
Applied Statistics: Principles and Examples (with David R. Cox, Chapman & Hall/CRC, 1981)
Applied Statistics: A Handbook of GENSTAT Analyses (with H. R. Simpson, 1982)
Applied Statistics: A Handbook of BMDP Analyses (Chapman & Hall/CRC, 1987)
Statistical Theory and Modelling: in Honour of Sir David Cox, FRS (edited with David Hinkley and Nancy Reid, Chapman & Hall/CRC, 1991)

Recognition

References

1930 births
Living people
British statisticians
Women statisticians
Academics of Imperial College London